Courtney Smith may refer to:

Courtney Smith (rugby union) (born 1971), retired professional rugby player
Courtney Smith (defensive back) (born October 17, 1984), American football cornerback
Courtney Smith (linebacker) (born October 26, 1984), Canadian football linebacker
Courtney Smith (wide receiver) (born March 6, 1987), American football wide receiver 
C. J. Smith (soccer) (born 1998), Canadian soccer player
Courtney Thorne-Smith, American actress